Morgantown Historic District is a national historic district located near Marshall, Fauquier County, Virginia.  It encompasses 7 contributing buildings and 2 contributing sites in the Reconstruction-era African-American rural village of Morgantown.  The district contains four dwellings, the Mount Nebo Baptist Church (1902), an abandoned Morgantown School (c. 1891), a meat house, the ruins of an outbuilding, and a cemetery.

It was listed on the National Register of Historic Places in 2004.

References

Historic districts in Fauquier County, Virginia
National Register of Historic Places in Fauquier County, Virginia
Historic districts on the National Register of Historic Places in Virginia